Steve or Stephen Sedgwick may refer to: 
 Steve Sedgwick (journalist)
 Steve Sedgwick (public servant)
 Stephen Sedgwick (mix engineer)